Südstern is a circus  of Kreuzberg district, Berlin, as well as a Berlin U-Bahn station of same denominator located on the .

History

Built by Alfred Grenander in 1924, the station was originally named "Hasenheide." In 1933 the name changed to "Kaiser-Friedrich-Platz," and to "Gardepionierplatz" in 1939.

On 24 May 1944, during the Battle of Berlin, two allied bombs hit the station and the ceiling collapsed.

In 1947 the station was renamed again, this time to its present “Südstern.” In 1958, the platform was elongated.

In 2010 the station was planned to gain accessibility support for the blind and partially-sighted, and an elevator.

References 

U7 (Berlin U-Bahn) stations
Buildings and structures in Friedrichshain-Kreuzberg
Railway stations in Germany opened in 1924